Mary Page Keller (born March 3, 1961) is an American actress known for roles on television. Keller began her career on the daytime soap operas Ryan's Hope (1982–1983) and Another World (1983–1985) and later starred in a number of television sitcoms. She starred as Laura Kelly in the Fox comedy series Duet (1987-1989) and in the show's spin-off, Open House (1989–1990). Keller later had lead roles in the short-lived sitcoms Baby Talk (1991–1992), Camp Wilder (1992–1993), and Joe's Life (1993).

In film, Keller is known for her performance in the comedy-drama Beginners (2010). In the 2000s, she had recurring and guest-starring roles in a number of television dramas. From 2014 to 2015, Keller starred as the mother of the lead character in the ABC Family drama series Chasing Life.

Early life
Keller trained at the University of Maryland and the Boston Conservatory of Music before entering the medium of television on the ABC television show, Ryan's Hope in 1982. During her times at university, she performed in a number of musical theatre productions, first in Washington D.C. and later in New York. She later moved to Los Angeles, California.

Career
As a child, Keller participated in productions at Toby's Dinner Theatre under the direction of director Toby Orenstein. She later began her acting career on daytime soap operas. She played Amanda Kirkland (1982–1983) on Ryan's Hope and Sally Frame (1983–85) on Another World.  Moving to primetime, she played the part of Laura Kelly on two Fox sitcoms, Duet (1987–89) and its spinoff Open House (1989–90). In 1992, Keller was lead actress in Season 2 of the ABC comedy series Baby Talk. She also starred in another short-lived ABC sitcom, Camp Wilder (1992–93). In 1993, she starred in Joe's Life, also on ABC. During the same years, Keller acted in a number of television films and had a dramatic role in Life Goes On.

As of mid-1990s, Keller has made many guest appearances on television series, including Ellen, The Practice, NCIS, Criminal Minds, 24, Mad Men, Castle, The Closer, CSI: Crime Scene Investigation, Supernatural, Pretty Little Liars and Scandal. She had recurring roles in Cybill,  JAG, NYPD Blue, Nip/Tuck, Commander in Chief and Hart of Dixie. She also was regular on Zoe, Duncan, Jack & Jane (1999) and starred as Johnny Kapahala's mother in the Disney Channel original movies Johnny Tsunami (1999) and Johnny Kapahala: Back on Board (2007). She played the lead character's mother in the 2010 comedy-drama film Beginners.

In 2011, Keller was cast as the lead character's mother in the ABC Family drama pilot Chasing Life. In April 2013, ABC Family picked up the pilot to series, for airing in 2014. She co-wrote the family dance school drama, 'The Dunnings' with her husband Thomas Ian Griffith.

Personal life
Keller has been married to her former Another World costar Thomas Ian Griffith since 1991. They have two sons, Conner and Eamon.

Filmography

Film

Television

Awards and nominations

References

External links
 
 
 
 
 "Yahoo! Movies"
 

1961 births
Living people
20th-century American actresses
21st-century American actresses
Actresses from Los Angeles County, California
American film actresses
American musical theatre actresses
American soap opera actresses
American stage actresses
American television actresses